Svetozar Čiplić (born 21 April 1965) is a Serbian politician. He served as the Minister of Human and Minority Rights from 2008 to 2011.

Education and career
Born in Novi Sad in 1965, he graduated from the University of Novi Sad Faculty of Law, where he also received a master's degree. He has been employed at the school since 1995, where he teaches constitutional law.

He was a member of the Novi Sad Executive Council, in charge of administration and regulations in 2001. From 2002 to 2007, he served on the bench of the Serbian Constitutional Court. From 7 July 2008 to 14 March 2011, he was the Minister of Human and Minority Rights, until his Ministry merged into Ministry of State Administration and Local Self-Government.

Čiplić publicly stated that minority ethnic group voter registration went smoothly despite widespread allegations of fraud.

Personal life
He is married, and has two children.

References

External links

1965 births
Living people
Politicians from Novi Sad
21st-century Serbian judges
Government ministers of Serbia
University of Novi Sad alumni
Constitutional court judges